Todd George Fancey is a Canadian guitarist, keyboardist, and solo artist. He is the guitarist for Vancouver-based indie rock band The New Pornographers and the bassist for the band Limblifter. Fancey is originally from Nova Scotia.

Early life
Fancey was born in Dartmouth, Nova Scotia, Canada.

Solo career
Fancey released his first solo album, Fancey on March Records in 2004. His second solo album, Schmancey, was released November 13, 2007 on What Are Records?. Fancey released his third solo album Love Mirage on January 27, 2017. His fourth album release is "County Fair" a collection of cover songs on January 26, 2018. His third and fourth albums were self-released on Stoner Disco Records.

Television
In 2008, Fancey participated off-screen in an episode of The Office entitled "Dinner Party". He portrayed Hunter (usually portrayed by Nicholas D'Agosto), Jan's administrative assistant who may have lost his virginity to her and wrote a song about it, although the storyline never revealed any evidence of such. The song, called 'That One Night," was co-written by Fancey, Gene Stupnitsky and Lee Eisenberg. The episode was nominated for an Emmy Award.

In April 2018 Todd was interviewed by Rolling Stone's Andy Greene Article about The Office Dinner Party episode.

In late 2010, NBC hired Todd to write a song that was featured on NBC's Prime Time Special.  Fancey was also hired to create music for Caprica, the Battlestar Galactica TV show prequel.

Discography

Solo aka "Fancey"
 Fancey – 2004
 Schmancey – 2007
 Love Mirage – 2017
 County Fair - 2018

With The New Pornographers
 Electric Version – 2003
 Twin Cinema – 2005
 Challengers – 2007
 Together – 2010
 Brill Bruisers – 2014
 Whiteout Conditions – 2017

References

External links

Todd Fancey 

Year of birth missing (living people)
Living people
Canadian rock guitarists
Canadian male guitarists
Canadian rock bass guitarists
Canadian rock singers
Canadian male singers
The New Pornographers members
Canadian indie rock musicians
Musicians from Vancouver
Musicians from Halifax, Nova Scotia
People from Dartmouth, Nova Scotia
Male bass guitarists